Neocentrophyidae is a family of kinorhynchs in the class Allomalorhagida.

Genera
Neocentrophyes Higgins, 1969
Paracentrophyes Higgins, 1983

References

Kinorhyncha
Ecdysozoa families